Mandawali - West Vinod Nagar is a metro station located on the Pink Line of the Delhi Metro. It was a part of Phase III of the Delhi Metro Network's expansion. The station was opened on October 31, 2018.

Station Layout

Layout

Exits

Connections

Bus
Delhi Transport Corporation bus routes number 85, 85EXT, 349A, 391, 534, 534A, 534C, 624A, 624ACL, 624BLnkSTL, 740, 740A, 740B, 740EXT, AC-534 serves the station from nearby Ras Vihar bus stop.

See also

Delhi
List of Delhi Metro stations
Transport in Delhi
Delhi Metro Rail Corporation
Delhi Suburban Railway
Delhi Monorail
Sanjay Lake
Mayur Vihar
Delhi Transport Corporation
East Delhi
New Delhi
National Capital Region (India)
List of rapid transit systems
List of metro systems

References

External links

 Delhi Metro Rail Corporation Ltd. (Official site)
 Delhi Metro Annual Reports
 
 UrbanRail.Net – descriptions of all metro systems in the world, each with a schematic map showing all stations.

Delhi Metro stations
Railway stations in East Delhi district